is a railway station in the city of Aisai, Aichi Prefecture, Japan, operated by Meitetsu.

Lines

Station layout
The station has a single island platform and a single side platform, connected by a footbridge. The platforms are not even: platform 1 can accommodate trains of eight carriages in length, whereas platforms 2 and 3 are shorter, and can accommodate trains of only up to six carriages. The station has automated ticket machines, Manaca automated turnstiles and is unattended.

Platforms

Adjacent stations

|-
!colspan=5|Nagoya Railroad

Station history
Saya Station was opened on April 3, 1898 as the middle of three stations on a section of line by the privately held Bisai Railroad, which was purchased by Meitetsu on August 1, 1925 becoming the Meitetsu Bisai Line.

Passenger statistics
In fiscal 2017, the station was used by an average of 4,280 passengers daily (boarding passengers only).

Surrounding area
Saya Junior High School
Saya Elementary School

See also
 List of Railway Stations in Japan

References

External links

 Official web page 

Railway stations in Japan opened in 1898
Railway stations in Aichi Prefecture
Stations of Nagoya Railroad
Aisai, Aichi